Klaus Schäfer may refer to one of several people:

 Klaus Schäfer (catholic theologian)
 Klaus Schäfer (physical chemist)
 Klaus Schäfer (politician)